Warkany syndrome refers to one of two genetic disorders, both named for Austrian-American geneticist Joseph Warkany:

Warkany syndrome 1, an X-linked syndrome linked to reduced head size and mental retardation that is no longer diagnosed
Trisomy 8, known as Warkany syndrome 2, a condition where a person has an extra copy of chromosome 8.